County Road 258, also known as Gamle Strynefjellsvegen, is a  long road that runs through the Videdalen valley between the village of Grotli in Skjåk Municipality and the village of Ospeli in Stryn Municipality. The road opened in 1894, but was replaced by National Road 15 in 1977 as the main route between the Nordfjord region and Eastern Norway. The road is closed from October to June and is designated one of eighteen National Tourist Routes in Norway. The Tystigbreen glacier lies just south of the road. The eastern part of road has a gravel surface as a heritage road.

Media gallery

References

External links
 Norway: Fv. 258 Old Strynefjell Road (video)

258
258
258
National Tourist Routes in Norway